The Ormskirk by-election of 5 April 1951 was held after the appointment of Conservative MP Ronald Cross as Governor of Tasmania.

The seat was safe, having been won at the 1950 United Kingdom general election by over 14,000 votes

Result of the previous general election

Result of the by-election

References

1951 elections in the United Kingdom
1951 in England
1950s in Lancashire
By-election, 1951
By-election, 1951
By-elections to the Parliament of the United Kingdom in Lancashire constituencies